Nickelocene is the organonickel compound with the formula Ni(η5-C5H5)2.  Also known as bis(cyclopentadienyl)nickel or NiCp2, this bright green paramagnetic solid is of enduring academic interest, although it does not yet have any known practical applications.

Structure and bonding
Ni(C5H5)2 belongs to a group of organometallic compounds called metallocenes.  Metallocenes usually adopt structures in which a metal ion is sandwiched between two parallel cyclopentadienyl (Cp) rings. In the solid-state, the molecule has D5d symmetry, wherein the two rings are staggered.

The Ni center has a formal +2 charge, and the Cp rings are usually assigned as cyclopentadienyl anions (Cp−), related to cyclopentadiene by deprotonation.  The structure is similar to ferrocene.  In terms of its electronic structure, three pairs of d electrons on nickel are allocated to the three d orbitals involved in Ni–Cp bonding: dxy, dx2–y2, dz2. The two remaining d-electrons each reside in the dyz and dxz orbitals, giving rise to the molecule's paramagnetism, as manifested in the unusually high field chemical shift observed in its 1H NMR spectrum. With 20 valence electrons, nickelocene has the highest electron count of the transition metal metallocenes. Cobaltocene, Co(C5H5)2, with only 19 valence electrons is, however, a stronger reducing agent, illustrating the fact that electron energy, not electron count determines redox potential.

Preparation
Nickelocene was first prepared by E. O. Fischer in 1953, shortly after the discovery of ferrocene, the first metallocene compound to be discovered.  It has been prepared in a one-pot reaction, by deprotonating cyclopentadiene with ethylmagnesium bromide, and adding anhydrous nickel(II) acetylacetonate. A modern synthesis entails treatment of anhydrous sources of NiCl2 (such as hexaamminenickel chloride)  with sodium cyclopentadienyl:
[Ni(NH3)6]Cl2  +  2 NaC5H5  →  Ni(C5H5)2  +  2 NaCl  +  6 NH3

Properties
Like many organometallic compounds, Ni(C5H5)2 does not tolerate extended exposure to air before noticeable decomposition. Samples are typically handled with air-free techniques.

Most chemical reactions of nickelocene are characterized by its tendency to yield 18-electron products with loss or modification of one Cp ring.
Ni(C5H5)2  +  4 PF3  →  Ni(PF3)4   +  organic products
The reaction with secondary phosphines follows a similar pattern:
2 Ni(C5H5)2  +  2 PPh2H  →  [Ni2(PPh2)2(C5H5)2]    +  2 C5H6

Nickelocene can be oxidized to the corresponding cation, which contains Ni(III).

Gaseous Ni(C5H5)2 decomposes to a nickel mirror upon contact with a hot surface, releasing the hydrocarbon ligands as gaseous coproducts.  This process has been considered as a means of preparing nickel films.

Nickelocene reacts with nitric acid to produce cyclopentadienyl nickel nitrosyl, a highly toxic organonickel compound.

References

External links
IARC Monograph "Nickel and Nickel compounds"
National Pollutant Inventory – Nickel and compounds Fact Sheet

Metallocenes
Organonickel compounds
Cyclopentadienyl complexes
Substances discovered in the 1950s